During the Second World War, the British Army created several field armies. There were formations that controlled multiple army corps, which in turn controlled numerous divisions. An army would also control additional artillery, engineers, and logistical units that would be used to support the subordinate corps and divisions as needed. Each army was generally under the control of a higher formation, such as an army group or a command. Over the course of the war, eight armies were formed. An attempt to form a ninth – the Second British Expeditionary Force, the second overall – was made, and one regional command was redesignated as an army for a short period. Inter-allied co-operation resulted in the creation of the First Allied Airborne Army, and deception efforts saw a further four armies existed within the British military structure. Seventeen armies, real or fictitious, were created, although they did not all exist at the same time.

The first army-level command, the British Expeditionary Force (BEF), was formed in September 1939 following the outbreak of the war and dispatched to France. It provides a complicated example of an army chain of command. Its commander General John Vereker, the Viscount Gort, was in control of the BEF and all British forces in France. While being responsible to report to a high-level French command, he was also made a subordinate of a French army group and was also under the command of the main British headquarters in London. An example of a simpler chain of command is provided by the Fourteenth Army that reported only to the 11th Army Group. The final army formed during the war was the Twelfth Army, which was created in May 1945.

Within the British military, armies were commanded by lieutenant-generals. For a variety of reasons, once the appointment was made, commanders could be promoted to a full general. There were several exceptions to this norm; John Vereker was a full general when he was placed in command of the BEF, as was Henry Maitland Wilson when he was chosen to lead the Ninth Army. General Claude Auchinleck was commander-in-chief of all forces based in the Middle East when he decided to take over personal command of the Eighth Army.

The size, composition, and strength of an army could dramatically vary. The BEF, the primary British force in 1940, was thirteen divisions strong and had a strength of around 394,000 men by May 1940. It was composed entirely of British formations. Others, such as the Eighth Army, were composed of forces from multiple nations. At the Second Battle of El Alamein, the Eighth Army had around 195,000 men consisting of Australian, British, French, Greek, Indian, New Zealand, and South African troops spread over eleven divisions and several additional brigades. In 1945, the Eighth Army was 632,980 men strong spread over eight divisions, various brigades, and other smaller units. It was then composed of British, Indian, Italian, New Zealand, and Polish troops, as well as the men of the Jewish Infantry Brigade. The Fourteenth Army, which fought in British India and Burma, was the largest British army-level formation assembled during the war. It commanded around one million soldiers from Britain, British India, and the British African colonies.

Armies

Footnotes

Citations

References

 
 
 
 
 
 
 
 
 
 
 
 
 
 
 
 
 
 
 
 

British armies
Wor
Armies